Yanaccacca (Quechua yana black, qaqa rock, "black rock") is a mountain in the Cordillera Blanca in the Andes of Peru which reaches a height of approximately . It is located in the Ancash Region, Huari Province, Huari District, southwest of Huari. The Rurichinchay River flows along its southern slope.

References 

Mountains of Peru
Mountains of Ancash Region